John Carey may refer to:

John Carey (animator), staff member of Warner Bros. Cartoons in the 1930s, 1940s and 1950s
John Carey (botanist), (1797–1880), British botanist
John Carey (Celticist), American scholar
John Carey (congressman) (1792–1875), United States Representative from Ohio; member of the Ohio House of Representatives
John Carey (courtier) (c. 1491–1552), courtier to King Henry VIII
John Carey (critic) (born 1934), British literary critic
John Carey (journalist) (born 1960), Irish sportswriter
John Carey (Australian politician), Western Australian politician
John Carey (Ohio state legislator) (born 1959), Republican member of the Ohio House of Representatives; former Ohio state senator
John Carey (Oregon politician), member of the Oregon Territorial Legislature, 1852
John Carey (Wisconsin politician) (1839–1888)
John Carey, 2nd Earl of Dover (1608–1677), English peer
John Carey, 3rd Baron Hunsdon (died 1617), English peer and politician
John L. Carey (died 1852), editor of the Baltimore American
Johnny Carey (1919–1995), Irish footballer and manager

See also
John Cary (disambiguation)
John Kerry (born 1943)